Kaya Clinic (also known as Kaya Skin Clinic) is an Indian multinational skincare, haircare, and bodycare treatment provider. It was founded in 2003 by Harsh Mariwala, the chairman of Marico.

There are more than 70 Kaya Clinics across 26 cities in India. Kaya also has 23 clinics across 3 countries in the Middle East and e-commerce portals in India & Middle East.

History
Harsh Mariwala conceptualized the prototype of Kaya Skin Clinic at Marico's corporate office in 2002. The company was incorporated on 27 March 2003 as part of Marico Limited.

In 2010, Kaya Limited acquired Singapore-based company Derma Rx, which they later divested to KV Asia Capital in December 2013.

It was demerged from Marico in September 2013 to become an independent entity called Marico Kaya Enterprises and its shares began trading on NSE and BSE in July 2014. In May 2015, as a result of a scheme of arrangement, Marico Kaya shares were suspended from trading, and shareholders were allotted equal number of Kaya Limited shares, which got listed on the exchanges in August 2015.

In 2016, Kaya rebranded itself as Kaya Clinic.

Business

Kaya Skin Clinic
There are 73 clinics spread across 26 cities in India and 23 clinics, spread across 3 countries and 9 cities, in the Middle East. It is the largest international chain of skincare clinics in the Middle East with presence across UAE, Saudi Arabia, & Oman. Kaya offers laser hair removal, anti-ageing, acne, pigmentation, scars, hair, body contouring, for both women and men.

Kaya Skin Bar
In 2013, Kaya introduced Kaya Skin Bar in India to tap the large skin and hair concern market. Kaya Skin Bars are shop-in-shop outlets across Shoppers Stop, Lifestyle, Health & Glow and other such chains.

Kaya E-Commerce
Kaya also launched its own e-commerce platform both in India & Middle East. 
Kaya's products are also available at other online portals like Nykaa, Amazon, Jabong, Myntra, Flipkart, and Big Basket in India, and Amazon and Noon in the Middle East.

Shareholding

The majority of the Kaya Limited's shares (60.70%) are held by the promoters group. The rest is divided between the individual public (20.93%), foreign institutions (6.30%), Mutual Funds (3.63%), Body Corporate (5.65%) and others as on 7 August 2015.

Indian investor and fund manager Porinju Veliyath, on behalf of his portfolio management firm Equity Intelligence India Ltd, bought a 5% stake in Kaya Limited on 8 June 2017.

References 

Indian companies established in 2003
Companies based in Mumbai
Cosmetics companies of India
Indian brands
2003 establishments in Maharashtra
Manufacturing companies established in 2003
Companies listed on the National Stock Exchange of India
Companies listed on the Bombay Stock Exchange